Pratiwi Pujilestari Sudarmono (born 31 July 1952) is an Indonesian scientist. She is currently a professor of microbiology at the University of Indonesia, Jakarta.

Early life and education 

Pratiwi Sudarmono received a master's degree from the University of Indonesia in 1977, and the Ph.D. in Molecular Biology from the University of Osaka, Japan, in 1984.

Career
She then started her scientific career as WHO grantee researching the molecular biology of Salmonella typhi. From 1994 to 2000, she was head of the Department of Microbiology of the Medical Faculty of the University of Indonesia. From 2001 to 2002, she was a scholar in the Fulbright New Century Scholars Program.

Space Shuttle Mission STS-61-H
In October 1985, she was selected to take part in the NASA Space Shuttle mission STS-61-H as a Payload Specialist. Taufik Akbar was her backup on the mission. However, after the Challenger disaster the deployment of commercial satellites like the Indonesian Palapa B-3 planned for the STS-61-H mission was canceled, thus the mission never took place. The satellite was later launched with a Delta rocket.

Awards and honors 
In 2019, Sudarmono was the recipient of the GE Indonesia Recognition for Inspiring Women in STEM award.

References

External links
 Spacefacts biography of Pratiwi Sudarmono

1952 births
Living people
University of Indonesia alumni
Indonesian biologists
People from Bandung
Osaka University alumni
Academic staff of the University of Indonesia
Indonesian women scientists